Indonesia competed at the 1976 Summer Olympics in Montreal, Quebec, Canada.

Competitors 
The following is the list of number of competitors participating in the Games:

Archery 

In Indonesia's second Olympic archery competition, one man and one woman competed. Only one point separated the scores of the two athletes, though the 2352 points that Leane Suniar received placed her far higher in the women's ranking than the 2353 points that counterpart Donald Pandiangan received placed him.

Women's Individual Competition
 Leane Suniar – 2352 points (→ 9th place)

Men's Individual Competition
 Donald Pandiangan – 2353 points (→ 19th place)

Athletics 

 Key
 Note–Ranks given for track events are within the athlete's heat only
 Q = Qualified for the next round
 q = Qualified for the next round as a fastest loser or, in field events, by position without achieving the qualifying target
 NR = National record
 N/A = Round not applicable for the event
 Bye = Athlete not required to compete in round

Boxing

Swimming

Weightlifting

See also
 1976 Olympic Games
 1976 Paralympic Games
 Indonesia at the Olympics
 Indonesia at the Paralympics
 Indonesia at the 1976 Summer Paralympics

References 
Official Olympic Reports
Indonesia at the 1976 Montréal Summer Games

Nations at the 1976 Summer Olympics
1976
1976 in Indonesian sport